Frigeridus may refer to:

Frigeridus (dux), Roman general, commander of the army of Pannonia Valeria under Gratian, fought in the Gothic War (376–382)
Renatus Profuturus Frigeridus, 5th-century historian